Two referendums were held together in the Republic of Ireland on 22 May 1998, each on a proposed amendment of the Irish constitution. Both measures were approved.  A referendum in Northern Ireland was also held on the same day.

Eighteenth amendment

The Eighteenth Amendment introduced two new articles into the constitution which allowed the government to ratify the Amsterdam Treaty.

Nineteenth amendment

The Nineteenth Amendment to the constitution allowed the government to ratify the Good Friday Agreement done at Belfast on 10 April 1998, which included changing articles 2 and 3 of the Irish constitution which effectively claimed Irish sovereignty over Northern Ireland. The agreement was also endorsed in the simultaneous referendum in Northern Ireland. Articles 2 and 3 were subsequently changed in December 1999, and the territorial claim was replaced with an aspiration for a united Ireland to be achieved "by peaceful means with the consent of a majority of the people, democratically expressed, in both jurisdictions in the island".

See also
Constitutional amendment
Politics of the Republic of Ireland
History of the Republic of Ireland
Politics of Northern Ireland
History of Northern Ireland

References

1998 in international relations
1998 in Irish law
1998 in Irish politics
1998 referendums
Ireland 1998
May 1998 events in Europe
Constitutional 1998